Meng Xiaoxue (born 4 March 1985) is a retired Chinese female short track speed skater.

She was twice World Championships bronze medalist in relay competitions. Her best personal achievement was third place in a 500 m race during the 2008-09 World Cup. At the World Cup events, she had also three victories as well as one second place in relay competitions.

References
 Athlete's Profile
 Person Bio
 Information about Meng Xiaoxue

1985 births
Living people
Chinese female short track speed skaters
Universiade medalists in short track speed skating
Medalists at the 2007 Winter Universiade
Medalists at the 2009 Winter Universiade
21st-century Chinese women
Universiade gold medalists for China
Universiade bronze medalists for China